Chief of Navy may refer to:

 Chief of Navy (Australia)
 Chief of Navy (Malaysia)
 Chief of Navy (New Zealand)
 Chief of Navy (Sweden)

See also
 Chief of Staff of the Navy (disambiguation)
 Chief of the Naval Staff (disambiguation)